David John Axon (1951 – 5 April 2012) was a British astrophysicist specialising in observations of active galactic nuclei. He was a professor at the University of Hertfordshire and the Rochester Institute of Technology (RIT), and at the time of his death was Head of the School of Mathematical and Physical Sciences at the University of Sussex.

Early life
David Axon was born in Doncaster in the county of Yorkshire, England, to an English father and Welsh mother. He studied at the University of Durham (Hatfield College), where he earned a BSc in Physics in 1972. In 1978 he completed his Ph.D. at the same institution under the direction of Arnold Wolfendale. He subsequently held research fellowships at the University of Sussex, University College London and the Institute of Astronomy at the University of Cambridge.

Career
In 1983 Axon was appointed to a faculty position at the University of Manchester where he taught Physics and carried out research at the Nuffield Radio Astronomy Laboratory at Jodrell Bank Observatory. In 1993 he took up an appointment at the Space Telescope Science Institute in Baltimore where he was the instrument scientist responsible for the NICMOS near infra-red camera. He returned to Manchester in 1998 but the following year was appointed Professor and Head of the Department of Physical Sciences at the University of Hertfordshire. From 2002–2008 he was Professor and Chair of the Physics Department at RIT. He maintained a research chair at Hertfordshire.

Contributions
David Axon was a leading expert in the field of astronomical polarimetry and the phenomenology of active galactic nuclei. His scientific accomplishments included discovery of the first, X-ray selected BL Lac object, discovery of the first "superwind" galaxy, and discovery of strong magnetic fields in the jets of young stellar objects.

Death
David Axon died in 2012 of an apparent heart attack while visiting RIT.

References

External links
 David Axon Memorial Meeting

1951 births
2012 deaths
21st-century British astronomers
Rochester Institute of Technology faculty
Academics of the University of Hertfordshire
Academics of the Victoria University of Manchester
Academics of the University of Sussex
Alumni of Hatfield College, Durham
British astrophysicists
Jodrell Bank Observatory
People from Doncaster